Ako si Ninoy is a 2023 Filipino musical drama and biographical film written and directed by Vincent Tañada. Adapted from Tañada's 2008 stage play of the same name, it focuses on the lives of 11 Filipinos which draw parallels to the life of Ninoy Aquino. It stars Juan Karlos Labajo, Sarah Holmes, and an ensemble cast of Johnrey Rivas, Marlo Mortel, Cassy Legazpi, Joaquin Domagoso, Nicole Laurel Asensio, JM Yusores, Adelle Ibarrientos, Vean Olmedo, Jomar Tañada, Brae Luke Quirante, and Bodjie Pascua.

The film was premiered at the Power Plant Mall on February 18, 2022 and theatrically released on February 22, 2023. It is the second stage play adapted by Vincent Tañada to film, following Katips.

Cast 

 Juan Karlos Labajo as Benigno "Ninoy" S. Aquino Jr.
 Sarah Holmes as Corazon "Cory" C. Aquino
 Johnrey Rivas as Noli
 Marlo Mortel as Quentin
 Cassy Legazpi as Ingrid
 Joaquin Domagoso as Yosef
 Nicole Laurel Asensio as Ms. Nuñez
 JM Yusores as Oscar
 Adelle Ibarrientos as Andeng
 Vean Olmedo as Ivy
 Jomar Tañada as Dr. Ungria
 Brae Luke Quirante as Osborne
 Bodjie Pascua as Nanding
 Jim Paredes as Benigno Aquino Sr.
 Pinky Amador as Mrs. Esmeralda Argos
 Lovely Rivero as Aurora Aquino
 Tuesday Vargas as Miss Sugar
 Donita Nose as Tanya
 Sarah Javier as Rebecca Quijano
 Carla Lim as Jessa
 Brylle Mondejar as Mang Simeon

Production 
The original musical stage play was written by Vincent Tañada and commissioned by Corazon Aquino through the Benigno S. Aquino, Jr. Foundation (now the Ninoy and Cory Aquino Foundation) in 2009. It was released shortly after her death in August 2009. Tañada said in a speech at the film's premiere that Aquino specifically requested that that Tañada "[should not] write only about us [the Aquino family]. Write also about our people." The stage play had over 500 shows all over the Philippines. Tañada decided to create a film adaptation of his stage play in 2022 as a response to the proliferation of historical distortion within the Philippines. He intended to make the film available for younger audiences to combat the increasing distortion against Aquino.

The stage play was originally developed together with historians, academics, and Corazon Aquino herself prior to her death. In writing the film, Tañada consulted historian Michael "Xiao" Chua, archivist Karl Patrick Suyat of Project Gunita, and Rebecca Quijano, who witnessed Aquino's assassination, to ensure the accuracy of scenes depicting historical events regarding Aquino, such as his assassination and his sentencing by a military commission to death. According to Chua, inaccuracies remained in the final film but the most important details were preserved.

Tañada considered actors Piolo Pascual and Jericho Rosales before choosing Juan Karlos Labajo to play Aquino in the film. Tañada chose Labajo to play the role of Aquino due to his young age and prior experience in singing. Pipo Cifra, a graduate of the University of Santo Tomas Conservatory of Music, was chosen by Tañada as the composer of the film. Cifra earlier collaborated with Tañada for Katips, a similar film detailing the life of activists during Marcos' martial law regime. Tañada served as the lyricist for the musical's songs, with the exception of Buwan, which was written and released by Labajo in 2018 and performed using a different rendition for the film.

In his premiere speech, Tañada also recalled attending the funeral of Ninoy Aquino as a child, who clung to the fabric of Aquino's hearse after being separated from his father. This scene is depicted in the movie, with Tañada's son, Peter Parker Tañada, playing as his father's younger self.

Release 
The film was premiered at the Power Plant Mall on February 18, 2022. Its premiere was attended by Aquino's daughter , her son, Francis Joseph “Kiko” Aquino-Dee, and Aquino's nephew Bam Aquino. At the premiere, Bam Aquino highlighted the importance of the film, noting the prevalence of disinformation regarding Ninoy Aquino.

The film was theatrically released on February 22, 2023. It was released exactly a week before the releases of two other historical films related to Ferdinand Marcos: Oras de Peligro, which tells the story of an impoverished family during the People Power Revolution, and Martyr or Murderer.

References

External links 

 

2021 films
2020s historical films
2020s musical drama films
2022 drama films
Filipino-language films
Films about activists
Films about miscarriage of justice
Films based on musicals
Films about rebellions
Films about totalitarianism
Films about anti-fascism
Films set in Metro Manila
Films set in the 1970s
Films set in the Philippines
Tagalog-language films